The timbrel or tabret (also known as the tof of the ancient Hebrews, the deff of Islam, the adufe of the Moors of Spain) was the principal percussion instrument of the ancient Israelites. It resembled either a frame drum or a modern tambourine.

History
The word timbrel is used in the Hebrew Bible in both singular and plural form, so as to suggest the former referred to a hoop of wood or metal over which was stretched a parchment head; while the latter was perhaps used to designate the tambourine with bells or jangles fixed at intervals in hoops. A tambourine is essentially a wooden frame drum with jangles or bells round the edges. In , where the word "tabering" occurs in the King James Version, it means beating on the breast, as drummers beat on the tabret. The Israelites learned to use the timbrel during their sojourn in Egypt, and in the Encyclopædia Britannica Eleventh Edition, Kathleen Schlesinger stated "it has been suggested that as the Egyptians used it to scare away their evil spirit Typhon", the word tof is derived from the latter. The tabret or timbrel was a favorite instrument of the women, and was used with dances, as by Miriam, to accompany songs of victory, or with the harp at banquets and processions; it was one of the instruments used by King David and his musicians when he danced before the Ark of the Covenant. It was also used in the valley of Hinnom at the sacrificial rites.

See also
Tabor (instrument)

Notes

References

Further reading

Hand drums
Membranophones
Israeli musical instruments
Ancient Hebrew musical instruments